Onnie Lee Logan (née Rodgers) (3 May 1910 – 12 July 1995) was an Alabama midwife, who relied on traditional knowledge and who trained lay midwives and served the needs of birthing women in an era when black women were not served equally in the era when hospitals emerged.

Early life 
According to an oral autobiography told to Katherine Clark, Onnie Lee was born in 1910 near Sweet Water, Marengo County, Alabama to Len Rodgers (also spelled as Rogers), and Martha Curtis, a midwife and farmer. Her exact date of birth is unknown, but is officially recorded as May 3, 1910. She was the fourteenth child of sixteen. Both her parents were farmers; her father also worked as a carpenter and her mother as a midwife. Onnie Lee was herself delivered by a local granny midwife, in part because of a lack of local practicing physicians who would accept black patients, but mainly because black granny midwives had traditionally performed this task since slavery times. In addition to her mother, many members of her family also practiced, including her mother-in-law, both her grandmothers, and one of her brothers-in-law. which was unusual. The prefix "granny" used in front of the term midwife was used to differentiate black midwives from whites, and this title placed limits on Logan's career that would remain with her throughout the entirety of her life, as it automatically and irreversibly placed her in the lower class, regardless of her consistent record of good work as a midwife.

Midwifery career 
Following in a family tradition of midwifery, Onnie Lee Logan's "motherwit," a spiritual calling from God, wove together the practical knowledge from her American Indian and African American heritage. Onnie Lee Logan's career as a practicing midwife went on between 1947 and 1984. Her traditions also relied on magical aid, for example, a knife placed under the mother's bed to help "cut" the pain. At the age of 21, Logan launched her midwifery career while working as a domestic servant in a wealthy white household. During the time of Logan's life, midwifery was not a career that she could afford to do by itself because it did not provide enough income to support her, which forced her to work two jobs hence why she was also a maid. She learned midwifery from her mother by attending numerous births and added to that with classroom learning. Logan became licensed by the Board of Health in 1949 and delivered almost every child born between 1931 and 1984 in Prichard and Crighton, the predominantly black areas of Mobile, Alabama. She delivered the babies of both black and white women of Alabama, losing only one baby in her 40 years of practice. She adopted a family-centered approach by encouraging the participation of fathers, understood the birth process as normal, "not a sickness," and relied on relaxation and gravity to facilitate the birthing process. Logan's clients seldom experienced perineal lacerations because she used a combination of breathing, hot compresses, oil, positioning, and encouragement. The first half of her story focuses on what it was like to grow up in a racist society and positions her career narrative within a complex set of race relations in the south. Her book includes positive stories of encouragement from local doctors as well as instances of Klan terror that included the castration of black males and infanticide of mixed-race babies. Alabama outlawed granny midwifery in 1976 but allowed Logan to continue practicing until 1984 before informing her that her permit would not be renewed and that her services were no longer needed. Logan trained midwives, including Mary Francis Hill Coley.

During Logan's career as a midwife, there were two instances where she was complemented by male doctors on her work. The first occurred in the 1930s when a doctor told Logan that she had the potential to become a great midwife, and the second was in the 1980s when another doctor told her that she would have made a good physician. However, Logan hinted later in her life that she had no interest in gaining such success that it became more important than simply doing the best that she could. Logan specifically stated that she felt she would not have been "no mo' successful being a registered nurse or a doctor," and she felt that her talents were truly God-given. She was passionate about providing help to the rural poor, and going further with her education could have potentially compromised her ability to do so to the extent that she was able to without a higher education. Logan was the last granny midwife in Mobile, Alabama. Although Logan did work in domestic work as a maid and was most widely known for this position rather than a midwife, she considered the work of midwifery to be her "real life's work".

Autobiography
Logan was the author of Motherwit: An Alabama Midwife's Story, as told to Katherine Clark, in the summer of 1984. According to a reviewer in the Georgia Historical Quarterly, The editor of her autobiography foregrounds the voice and circular oral narrative of a black midwife with a life of experience she wants to share rather than take to her grave. The Journal of Nurse-Midwifery noted that the autobiography grants respect to the traditional arts of midwifery.

Logan's life ended in 1995.

References

Further reading 

1910 births
1995 deaths
American midwives
20th-century American women